is a 2014 Japanese crime mystery drama film directed by Shinsuke Sato.

Cast
Haruka Ayase
Tori Matsuzaka
Eriko Hatsune
Pierre Deladonchamps
Hiroaki Murakami
Kazuya Kojima

Reception
The film has grossed ¥140 million in Japan.

On Film Business Asia, Derek Elley gave the film a rating of 7 out of 10, calling it a "well-packaged deductive mystery-thriller".

References

External links

2014 crime drama films
2010s mystery drama films
Films based on Japanese novels
Films directed by Shinsuke Sato
Japanese crime drama films
Japanese mystery drama films
2010s Japanese films